The Bridgewater Ice Arena in Bridgewater, Massachusetts dual-surface public ice hockey rink. The facility is currently used by both the Bridgewater Bandits and Stonehill Skyhawks as a home venue.

Stonehill
In 2022, Stonehill College announced that it would be promoting all of its athletic programs to Division I for the following academic year. Because both the men's and women's programs used the Bridgewater Ice Arena as their respective homes, the rink will be one of the smallest home sites in D-I hockey.

References

External links
 Official Site

Stonehill Skyhawks men's ice hockey
College ice hockey venues in the United States
Indoor ice hockey venues in the United States
Indoor ice hockey venues in Massachusetts
1995 establishments in Massachusetts